The Dresden school was a baroque Neo-Renaissance architectural style developed in Dresden, Germany, primarily by Gottfried Semper and Hermann Nicolai. The style is associated with European architects mainly from Germany and Italy who built buildings and later city villas in large numbers, but also synagogues and public schools. Semper built the Dresden Semperoper, with the panther-quadriga (chariot) by sculptor Johannes Schilling (1828–1910). Important sculptors were Ernst Rietschel and Ernst Julius Hähnel.

Music
The term is also used to describe the work of musicians and composers who were based in the city, from the later half of the 17th century, such as Johann Jakob Walther and Johann Paul von Westhoff. Their work  greatly influenced the subsequent generation of German violinists, in particular Johann Sebastian Bach's famous violin sonatas and partitas.

See also
 Blue Wonder

Sources
Jarl Kremeier, "Dresden" Grove Art Online. Oxford University Press, [December 13, 2005].

References

Dresden
Renaissance Revival architecture in Germany
Baroque Revival architecture